Ramdurg Assembly constituency is one of the 224 seats in Karnataka State Assembly in India. It is part of Belagavi Lok Sabha seat.

Members of Assembly

Bombay State
 1951: Hanamanta Yallappa Mumbaraddi, Indian National Congress

Mysore State
 1957: Pattan Mahadevappa Shivabasappa, Independent
 1962: Ramanagouda Shivashiddappagouda Patil, Indian National Congress
 1967: P. S. Madevappa, Indian National Congress
 1972: R. S. Patil, Indian National Congress

Karnataka State
 1978: Patil Ramanagouda Shivashiddanagouda, Indian National Congress (Indira)
 1983: Koppad Fakirappa Allappa, Indian National Congress
 1985: Hirareddi Basavantappa Basappa, Janata Party
 1989: Patil Rudragouda Tikanagouda, Indian National Congress
 1994: Hireraddi Basavantappa Basappa, Janata Dal
 1999: N. V. Patil, Indian National Congress
 2004: Yadawad Mahadevappa Shivalingappa, Bharatiya Janata Party
 2008: Ashok Mahadevappa Pattan, Bharatiya Janata Party
 2013: Ashok Mahadevappa Pattan, Indian National Congress
 2018: Mahadevappa Shivalingappa Yadawad,  Bharatiya Janata Party

See also 
 Belagavi District
 List of constituencies of Karnataka Legislative Assembly

References 

Assembly constituencies of Karnataka